Steven Long is an American writer.

Steven Long may also refer to:

Steven S. Long, role-playing game author
Steve Long (died 1868), Western lawman and outlaw
Steve Long (soccer) (born 1957), retired Zaire/U.S. soccer player
Steven Wayne Long, member of the South Carolina House of Representatives

See also
Stephen Long (disambiguation)